The Keetch–Byram drought index (known as KBDI), created by John Keetch and George Byram in 1968 for the United States Department of Agriculture's Forest Service, is a measure of drought conditions. It is commonly used for the purpose of predicting the likelihood and severity of wildfire. It is calculated based on rainfall, air temperature, and other meteorological factors.

The KBDI is an estimate of the soil moisture deficit, which is the amount of water necessary to bring the soil moisture to its full capacity. A high soil moisture deficit means there is little water available for evaporation or plant transpiration. This occurs in conditions of extended drought, and has significant effects on fire behaviour.

In the United States, it is expressed as a range from 0 to 800, referring to hundredths of an inch of deficit in water availability; in countries that use the metric system, it is expressed from 0 to 200, referring to millimetres.

See also
National Fire Danger Rating System
Palmer drought index
McArthur Forest Fire Danger Index
 1988 revision of the paper, "A drought index for forest fire control.". http://www.srs.fs.fed.us/pubs/rp/rp_se273.pdf

References

Droughts
Hazard scales
Hydrology
Wildfires
Meteorological indices